Peak signal-to-noise ratio (PSNR) is an engineering term for the ratio between the maximum possible power of a signal and the power of corrupting noise that affects the fidelity of its representation. Because many signals have a very wide dynamic range, PSNR is usually expressed as a logarithmic quantity using the decibel scale.

PSNR is commonly used to quantify reconstruction quality for images and video subject to lossy compression.

Definition 
PSNR is most easily defined via the mean squared error (MSE). Given a noise-free m×n monochrome image I and its noisy approximation K, MSE is defined as
 

The PSNR (in dB) is defined as
 

Here, MAXI is the maximum possible pixel value of the image. When the pixels are represented using 8 bits per sample, this is 255. More generally, when samples are represented using linear PCM with B bits per sample, MAXI is 2B − 1.

Application in color images 
For color images with three RGB values per pixel, the definition of PSNR is the same except that the MSE is the sum over all squared value differences (now for each color, i.e. three times as many differences as in a monochrome image) divided by image size and by three. Alternately, for color images the image is converted to a different color space and PSNR is reported against each channel of that color space, e.g., YCbCr or HSL.

Quality estimation with PSNR 
PSNR is most commonly used to measure the quality of reconstruction of lossy compression codecs (e.g., for image compression). The signal in this case is the original data, and the noise is the error introduced by compression. When comparing compression codecs, PSNR is an approximation to human perception of reconstruction quality.

Typical values for the PSNR in lossy image and video compression are between 30 and 50 dB, provided the bit depth is 8 bits, where higher is better. The processing quality of 12-bit images is considered high when the PSNR value is 60 dB or higher. For 16-bit data typical values for the PSNR are between 60 and 80 dB. Acceptable values for wireless transmission quality loss are considered to be about 20 dB to 25 dB.

In the absence of noise, the two images I and K are identical, and thus the MSE is zero. In this case the PSNR is infinite (or undefined, see Division by zero).

Performance comparison 
Although a higher PSNR generally indicates that the reconstruction is of higher quality, in some cases it may not. One has to be extremely careful with the range of validity of this metric; it is only conclusively valid when it is used to compare results from the same codec (or codec type) and same content.

Generally, PSNR has been shown to perform poorly compared to other quality metrics when it comes to estimating the quality of images and particularly videos as perceived by humans.

Variants 
PSNR-HVS is an extension of PSNR that incorporates properties of the human visual system such as contrast perception.

PSNR-HVS-M improves on PSNR-HVS by additionally taking into account visual masking. In a 2007 study, it delivered better approximations of human visual quality judgements than PSNR and SSIM by large margin. It was also shown to have a distinct advantage over DCTune and PSNR-HVS.

See also
 Data compression ratio
 Perceptual Evaluation of Video Quality (PEVQ)
 Structural similarity (SSIM) index
 Subjective video quality
 Video Multimethod Assessment Fusion
 Video quality

References

Image compression
Noise (graphics)
Film and video technology
Digital television
Engineering ratios

vi:PSNR